Lynn Fordham (born April 1963) is a British businesswoman and CEO of SVG Capital, a FTSE 250 Index private equity and investment management business.

Early life
Lynn Fordham was born in April 1963. She received a bachelor's degree in Accountancy from Glasgow University and a Diploma of Business Administration from Warwick University.

Career
Fordham trained as an accountant at Peat Marwick, Mitchell & Co.

Fordham joined SVG Capital from Barratt Developments in July 2008, and was appointed CEO on 20 May 2009, a role she continues to hold.

References

1963 births
Living people
Alumni of the University of Glasgow
Alumni of the University of Warwick
British chief executives
Women chief executives